The first season of the 2012 anime television series  by David Production, also known as JoJo's Bizarre Adventure: The Animation, adapted the first two arcs of Hirohiko Araki's manga of the same name:  and . The Phantom Blood arc, which aired on Tokyo MX between October 6 and December 1, 2012, revolves around the mysterious adventures of the Joestar family, beginning with an encounter involving Jonathan Joestar, his adoptive brother Dio Brando, and a Stone Mask that transforms people into vampires. The Battle Tendency arc, which aired on Tokyo MX between December 8, 2012, and April 6, 2013, focuses on Jonathan's grandson, Joseph Joestar, and his fight against the Pillar Men, ancient humanoids which created the Stone Mask.

The series was released on a series of nine DVDs and Blu-rays between January 30 and September 27, 2013, with the Blu-ray releases having the option of English subtitles. Crunchyroll began streaming the series in April 2014. The English DVD was released by Warner Home Video on September 22, 2015 with both English and Japanese audio with closed captioning for the English dub only. Viz Media released an English Blu-ray set on July 25, 2017 that includes English and Japanese audio with new subtitles for the Japanese . A second season, JoJo's Bizarre Adventure: Stardust Crusaders, based on the series' third arc, began airing from April 5, 2014.

Plot
The first season was split into two parts: part 1 comprised episodes 1–9 covering the Phantom Blood manga arc, and part 2 comprised episodes 10–26 covering the Battle Tendency arc.

The first part, Phantom Blood, is set in the early-to-late 1880s in England. George Joestar takes in the orphan Dio Brando to pay off a debt to Dio's late father Dario. Dio's attempts to become the sole heir to the Joestar fortune are thwarted and he resorts to using an ancient Stone Mask which transforms him into a vampire with his sights now set on world domination. With Will A. Zeppeli, a master of a supernatural ability called Hamon, and former street thug Robert E.O. Speedwagon at his side, George's son Jonathan trains in Hamon and stops Dio who is left aboard an exploding ship after he mortally wounds Jonathan. However, Jonathan's wife Erina is pregnant with a child and escapes, continuing the Joestar name.

The second part, Battle Tendency, takes place in 1939. Jonathan's grandson Joseph teams up with Will's grandson Caesar Zeppeli to battle ancient humanoids called the Pillar Men, but are overwhelmed by the Pillar Man Wamuu. Joseph and Caesar have a month to defeat the Pillar Men Esidisi and Wamuu to obtain the antidotes for the poisoned rings in Joseph's windpipe and aorta, while also preventing them from gaining a powerful stone called the Super Aja. The two are trained in controlling Hamon by the Hamon coach Lisa Lisa. Joseph defeats Esidisi and Wamuu, but Kars obtains the Super Aja, becoming more powerful. Aided by the German soldier Rudol von Stroheim, Joseph uses the Super Aja against Kars to defeat him. In the epilogue set in the 1980s, a "treasure chest" engraved with the name "DIO" is salvaged from the sea, while an older Joseph is set to meet his daughter in Japan.

Voice cast 
See a detailed List of JoJo's Bizarre Adventure characters.

Music 
The first season of JoJo's Bizarre Adventure uses three pieces of theme music, two opening themes and one ending theme. The first opening theme is the song  performed by Hiroaki "Tommy" Tominaga, vocalist of Japanese "brass rock" band Bluff, as the opening theme for the Part 1 episodes. The score for Part 1 was composed by Hayato Matsuo, and was released in two parts as Destiny, a bonus disc in the first Blu-ray box set released on January 30, 2013, and Future, a separate CD release on February 22, 2013. Future debuted at number 95 on the Billboard Japan Top Albums charts and peaked at 115 on the Oricon Weekly Album Charts. The opening theme song for the Part 2 episodes is "Bloody Stream" by Coda. Its score is composed by Taku Iwasaki, and was released in two parts as Musik (German for "Music"), a standalone CD release on March 29, 2013, and as Leicht Verwendbar (German for "Light User"), a bonus disc for Blu-ray box set volume 4 on April 26, 2013. Musik debuted at number 63 on the Japan Top Albums charts and at 89 on the Weekly Album Charts. The ending theme for the whole season is British progressive rock band Yes' 1972 single "Roundabout".

Episode list

Phantom Blood

Battle Tendency

Notes

References

External links 
Official website 

JoJo's Bizarre Adventure episode lists
2012 Japanese television seasons
2013 Japanese television seasons
Television series set in the 1880s
Television series set in the 1930s